Astarte subaequilatera, or the lentil astarte, is a species of bivalve mollusc in the family Astartidae. It can be found along the Atlantic coast of North America, ranging from Labrador to Florida.

References

Astartidae
Bivalves described in 1854